Deborah Angela Elspeth Marie Abrahams ( Morgan; born 15 September 1960) is a British Labour Party politician who has served as the Member of Parliament (MP) for Oldham East and Saddleworth since 2011.

Abrahams was a member of the Shadow Cabinet of Jeremy Corbyn from 2015 to 2018. She remains in the House of Commons as a backbencher.

Early and professional life
Abrahams was born in Sheffield, West Riding of Yorkshire; her father was a dentist. She was privately educated, going on to study biochemistry and physiology at the University of Salford; her early employment was as a community worker for a charity in Wythenshawe in south Manchester, where she set up job training programmes for teenagers. She later studied for a master's degree at the University of Liverpool. Abrahams was head of healthy cities for Knowsley and served on the board of Bury and Rochdale Health Authority.

In 2002, Abrahams was appointed chair of Rochdale Primary Care Trust. She was Director of the International Health Impact Assessment Consortium at the University of Liverpool between 2006 and 2010.

Early political career
She resigned from the Chair of Rochdale Primary Care Trust in 2007, over the use of private health companies in the National Health Service, which she said was "destroying the NHS". She then joined the Labour Party, declaring that she wanted "to challenge health policy at a local and national level to ensure that it reflects [the] core values" of the NHS. She was appointed by Simon Danczuk, then Labour candidate for Rochdale, as his advisor on health, and she stood for Rochdale Borough Council in Milnrow and Newhey ward in the 2008 local elections. She criticised the local council in Rochdale for failing to address health inequalities in the town.

At the 2010 general election, Abrahams was the Labour Party candidate for Colne Valley; she made a plea to Liberal Democrat voters to back her in order to stop the Conservatives winning power. She was unsuccessful in her attempt to retain the seat, which had previously been held by Labour, and ended up in third place.

The winning candidate, Conservative Member of Parliament (MP) Jason McCartney, said after the election that Abrahams had run "a good, positive campaign" and that in the light of bad-tempered exchanges between Conservatives and Liberal Democrats, he was not surprised that she was close to coming second.

Parliamentary career
In December 2010, Abrahams was placed on a shortlist of three to be the Labour Party candidate for the Oldham East and Saddleworth by-election. She was selected as Labour's candidate and retained the seat for the Labour Party with a majority of 3,558 with 42.1% of the vote.

Abrahams was appointed parliamentary private secretary to Andy Burnham and elected Chair of the Parliamentary Labour Party's Health Committee. In 2014, she organised an Inquiry Into The Effectiveness Of International Health Systems which she said demonstrated that "where there is competition, privatisation or marketisation in a health system, health equity worsens". She sought to reassure Clinical commissioning groups that the Labour Party's proposed health reforms would not amount to a top-down ‘big bang’ shake up of the NHS.

She was elected as a member of the Work and Pensions Select Committee in July 2015. In September 2015, Abrahams was appointed Shadow Minister for Disabled People by Labour leader Jeremy Corbyn in recognition on her work with disabled people in the past. Abrahams was appointed Shadow Secretary of State for Work and Pensions in June 2016, following Owen Smith's resignation from the Shadow Cabinet in the wake of the EU Referendum result.

In the general election of 8 June 2017 she retained the Oldham East and Saddleworth seat with an increased majority of 8,182. Her majority narrowed to 1,503 in the 2019 United Kingdom general election.

In 2021, Abrahams was one of three MPs who successfully took legal action against the Department of Health and Social Care over contracts awarded during the COVID-19 pandemic.

2018 bullying claims 
In March 2018, Abrahams was suspended from her position as Shadow Work and Pensions Secretary whilst she was investigated by the Labour Party over a "workplace issue", reported by several media outlets to be related to claims that she bullied staff; she has vehemently denied the claims, adding that she is the victim of a "bullying culture of the worst kind". In May that year she was removed from the Shadow Cabinet. In a statement, Abrahams said: "I strongly refute [sic] the allegations of bullying made against me. I believe the investigation was not thorough, fair or independent." She said she would now go to the party's National Executive Committee disputes panel.

Awards
In January 2013, Abrahams was awarded the Grassroot Diplomat Initiative Award in the Business Driver category, for her campaign to improve late payments affecting small businesses. She not only signed up to be a Champion of the Federation of Small Businesses Real-Life Entrepreneurs Campaign, but has been at the forefront of a campaign to improve the speed with which small businesses are paid by their customers.

Personal life
Abrahams married John Abrahams, a former captain of Lancashire County cricket team, in the late 1980s. They have two daughters, Victoria and Dawn.

References

External links

 Debbie Abrahams MP, Grassroot Diplomat

|-

1960 births
Alumni of the University of Liverpool
Alumni of the University of Salford
Female members of the Parliament of the United Kingdom for English constituencies
Labour Party (UK) MPs for English constituencies
Living people
Members of the Parliament of the United Kingdom for constituencies in Greater Manchester
Politicians from Sheffield
Politics of the Metropolitan Borough of Oldham
UK MPs 2010–2015
UK MPs 2015–2017
UK MPs 2017–2019
21st-century British women politicians
UK MPs 2019–present
21st-century English women
21st-century English people